Halder is an unincorporated community located in the town of Emmet, Marathon County, Wisconsin, United States. The community was named for George Halder, a Wausau, Wisconsin alderman. The post office was established in July 1887.

Notable people
Thomas O'Connor, farmer and politician, lived in Halder.

Notes

Unincorporated communities in Marathon County, Wisconsin
Unincorporated communities in Wisconsin